Konyak is a Sino-Tibetan language spoken by the Konyak people in the state of Nagaland, north-eastern India.

The language has  speakers in the state (as of the 2011 census); most of these are in Mon district, with smaller populations in the districts of Dimapur, Kohima, Mokokchung, and Longleng. There are also an estimated 2,000 speakers in neighbouring Myanmar, specifically in Hkamti District and in Lahe township.

Dialects
Ethnologue lists the following dialects of Konyak.

Tableng is the standard dialect spoken in Wanching and Wakching.

Phonology 
There are three lexically contrastive contour tones in Konyak – rising (marked in writing by an acute accent – á), falling (marked by a grave accent – à) and level (unmarked).

Vowels 

Consonants 

The dental  is realised as an alveolar if preceded by a vowel with a rising tone. If  morpheme-initial or intervocalic,  is pronounced with audible friction.

References

Bibliography

Further reading 

Languages of Nagaland
Sal languages
Endangered languages of India